Huddersfield Town's 1952–53 campaign was Town's first season back in the 2nd Division since the 1919–20 season. Under the leadership of Andy Beattie, Town returned to the top flight at the first attempt. They finished in 2nd place behind Sheffield United by 2 points, with 58 points. The main reasons for Town's success during the season were the 45 goals between Jimmy Glazzard and Vic Metcalfe. Also, 7 of Town's players (Jack Wheeler, Ron Staniforth, Laurie Kelly, Bill McGarry, Don McEvoy, Len Quested and Vic Metcalfe) played every game in the season, while Jimmy Glazzard missed just the last game of the season.

Squad at the start of the season

Review
Andy Beattie's first full season in charge of the Terriers had one simple objective – return Town to the top flight as soon as possible. The start of the season saw Town go on a 10-match unbeaten run, abruptly ended by a defeat at home to Nottingham Forest in early October. This was then followed by 5 consecutive wins, followed swiftly by 2 consecutive losses to Leicester City and West Ham United. Town's form continued to improve with Town only losing 5 more matches between December and the end of the season on 1 May.

The main reason for Town's success was their defence which remained unchanged all season. The 6-man defence of Jack Wheeler in goal, protected by Ron Staniforth, Laurie Kelly, Bill McGarry, Don McEvoy and Len Quested only let in 33 league goals all season, 22 less than champions Sheffield United. Vic Metcalfe played every game as well, while 30-goal Jimmy Glazzard just missed the final game against Plymouth Argyle. His replacement, Roy Shiner, scored a hat-trick in a 4–0 win, which cemented Town's second-place finish and guaranteed their return to Division 1 after one season out.

Squad at the end of the season

Results

Division Two

FA Cup

Appearances and goals

Huddersfield Town A.F.C. seasons
Huddersfield Town